Rangtong and shentong are two distinctive views on emptiness (sunyata) and the two truths doctrine within Tibetan Buddhism.

Rangtong ("empty of self-nature") is a philosophical term in Tibetan Buddhism that is used to distinguish the majority Madhyamaka teaching on the meaning of śūnyatā or "emptiness", namely that all phenomena are empty of an enduring and/or unchanging essence or "self," and that this emptiness is not an absolute reality, but a mere nominal characterisation of phenomena. It is related to the prasangika approach, which argues that no syllogistic forms of reasoning should be used to debate the notion of inherent existence, but only arguments which show the logical implications and absurdity of positions based upon inherent existence. This position is the mainstream Gelugpa interpretation of Madhyamaka, one of the main Mahayana schools, which dominates Vajrayana Buddhism.

Shentong (also transliterated zhäntong or zhentong; literally "other-emptiness") is a position within Tibetan Madhyamaka. It applies śūnyatā in a specific way, agreeing that relative reality is empty of self-nature, but stating that absolute reality (Paramarthasatya) is "non-dual Buddhajnana" and "empty" only of "other," relative phenomena, but is itself not empty and "truly existing." This absolute reality is described by positive terms, an approach which helps "to overcome certain residual subtle concepts" and "the habit [...] of negating whatever experience arises in his/her mind." It destroys false concepts, as does prasangika, but it also alerts the practitioner "to the presence of a dynamic, positive Reality that is to be experienced once the conceptual mind is defeated."

Shentong was systematized and articulated under that name by Dolpopa Sherab Gyaltsen (1292–1361), who identified absolute reality with the Buddha-nature. Shentong was suppressed by the dominant Gelug school for several hundred years, equally for political reasons as doctrinal reasons. In 1658, the Gelug authorities banned the Jonang school for political reasons, forcibly converting its monks and monasteries to the Gelug school, as well as banning shentong philosophy and books, thus making the rangtong position the overwhelmingly majority one in Tibetan Buddhism.

After this suppression various shentong views were propagated mainly by Karma Kagyu and Nyingma lamas. The 19th century saw a revival of Shentong-views, and continued with the Rimé movement. Nowadays Shentong is present primarily as the main philosophical theory of the Jonang school, although it is also taught by the Sakya and Kagyu schools, where it is identified with centerless awareness.

Etymology
The term rangtong is not an autonym but rather arose from the shentong theorist Dolpopa Sherab Gyaltsen, who coined the term "shentong" to characterise his own teachings and "rangtong" to refer to the teachings he opposed.

Shentong literally means "other-emptiness", "empty" of "other", i.e., empty of all qualities other than its own inherent existence.  Yet, the term shentong also refers to Yogacara teachings, or Yogacara Madhyamaka, which includes the teachings of Śāntarakṣita. In the Gelugpa understanding of the Svatantrika-Prasaṅgika distinction, Yogacara Madhyamaka is labeled as svatantrika, and set against a strict prasaṅgika approach which rejects any inherent existence.

Another translation of shentong is "extrinsic emptiness," a term which is also used to refer to "Great Mādhyamaka" (dbu ma chen po), a term which has also been used by Klong chen pa and Mipham to refer to Prasaṅgika Madhyamaka, and Tsongkhapa has also used this term.

Rangtong
Rangtong is the majority Tibetan teaching on the nature of śūnyatā or "emptiness", namely that all phenomena are empty of a self-nature in both the relative and absolute sense, without positing anything beyond that. This position is the mainstream Tibetan interpretation of Madhyamaka, especially by the followers of Prasaṅgika Mādhyamaka.

Tsongkhapa (1357–1419), who also wrote in response to shentong, is the most outspoken defendant of rangtong. He saw emptiness as a consequence of dependent designation, the teaching that no thing or phenomenon has an existence of its own, but always comes into existence in dependence upon conceptual designation by a conscious mind. (See Designation & "Conventional Truth".)

Tsongkhapa's view on "ultimate reality" is condensed in the sort text In Praise of Dependent Arising c.q. In Praise of Relativity c.q. The Essence of Eloquency. It states that "things" do exist conventionally, but ultimately everything is dependently arisen, and therefore void of inherent existence:

This means that conventionally things do exist, and that there is no use in denying that. But it also means that ultimately those things have no 'existence of their own', and that cognizing them as such results from cognitive operations, not from some unchangeable essence. Tsongkhapa:

It also means that there is no "transcendental ground," and that "ultimate reality" has no existence of its own, but is the negation of such a transcendental reality, and the impossibility of any statement on such an ultimately existing transcendental reality: it is no more than a fabrication of the mind. Susan Kahn further explains:

Shentong

Philosophy

Shentong views the two truths doctrine as distinguishing between relative and absolute reality, agreeing that relative reality is empty of self-nature, but stating that absolute reality is "empty" only of "other" relative phenomena, but is itself not empty. This absolute reality is the "ground or substratum" which is "uncreated and indestructible, noncomposite and beyond the chain of dependent origination." Dolpopa identified this absolute reality with the Buddha-nature.

The shentong-view is related to the Ratnagotravibhāga sutra and the Yogacara-Madhyamaka synthesis of Śāntarakṣita. The truth of sunyata is acknowledged, but not considered to be the highest truth, which is the empty nature of mind. Insight into sunyata is preparatory for the recognition of the nature of mind.

Hookham explains the Shentong position, referring to her Kagyu teacher Khenpo Tsultrim's Progressive Stages of Meditation on Emptiness. Khenpo Tsultrim presents five stages of meditation, which he relates to five different schools or approaches:
 "Sravaka meditation on non-self" - meditation on the emptiness of the skandhas and the non-existence of a personal self;
 "Cittamatra-approach" - meditation on the mind-stream, the ever-continuing process of perception, and the non-duality of perceived and perceiver;
 "Svatantrika-Madhyamaka approach" - meditation on all dhammas, which are empty of self-nature, and the negation of any "substance";
 "Prasangika-Madhyamaka approach" - meditation on "the non-conceptual (nisprapanca) nature of both the appearance of phenomena and their self-emptiness." In this approach, all concepts are to be abandoned;
  Shentong (Yogacara Madhyamaka) - meditation on Paramarthasatya ("Absolute Reality"), Buddhajnana, which is beyond concepts, and described by terms as "truly existing." This approach helps "to overcome certain residual subtle concepts," and "the habit - fostered on the earlier stages of the path - of negating whatever experience arises in his/her mind." It destroys false concepts, as does prasangika, but it also alerts the practitioner "to the presence of a dynamic, positive Reality that is to be experienced once the conceptual mind is defeated."

Origins and development
The notion of sentong grew out the Tibetan attempts to reconcile the contradiction between the Madhyama stance on the emptiness of phenomena, and the later notion of an eternal Buddha-nature.

The earliest shentong views are usually asserted to have been presented in a group of treatises variously attributed jointly to Asanga and Maitreyanātha, especially in the treatise known as the Unsurpassed Continuum (Uttaratantraśāstra, also called the Ratnagotravibhāga), and in a body of Mādhyamaka treatises attributed to Nāgārjuna (e.g., the Dharmadhātustava, "In praise of the Dharmadhatu").

The first exposition of a shentong view is sometimes attributed to Śāntarakṣita ( 725–788), but most scholars argue that his presentation of Madhyamaka thought is more accurately labeled Yogācāra-Svātantrika-Madhyamaka. The eleventh-century Tibetan master Yumo Mikyo Dorje, a student of the Kashmiri scholar Somanatha, was possibly the first Tibetan master to articulate a shentong view, after his experiences during a Kālacakra retreat.

Shentong was systematized and articulated under that name by Dolpopa Sherab Gyaltsen (1292–1361), who was originally a Sakya-trained lama, and joined the Jonang school with which shentong is strongly associated. In 1321 Dolpopa visited Tsurphu Monastery for the first time, and had extensive discussions with Rangjung Dorje (1284–1339) about doctrinal issues. It appears that Rangjung Dorje almost certainly influenced the development of some of Dolpopa's theories, possibly including his shentong method. Dolpopa claimed to have extraordinary insights, and his meditational experience seems to have played a great role in the development of his shentong-stance. Dolpopa developed a new philosophical vocabulary, based on Sanskrit and Tibetan, to express his insights, presenting provisional statements on absolute reality and Buddha-nature as statements of definitive meaning, which didn't require further interpretation.

Chödrak Gyatso, 7th Karmapa Lama (1454–1506), and the Sakya scholar Shakya Chokden (1428–1507) were also important proponents of a shentong view. In the Jonang tradition, Tāranātha [1575–1635] is second in importance only to Dolpopa Sherab Gyaltsen himself. He was responsible for the short-lived renaissance of the school as a whole in the late sixteenth and early seventeenth centuries, and of the widespread revitalization of the shentong theory in particular. Tāranātha wrote a commentary on the Heart Sutra which asserts that the Sutra, and prajñāpāramitā, teaches the Shentong view.

After the suppression of the Jonang school and its texts and the texts of Shakya Chokden by the Tibetan government in the seventeenth century, various shentong views were propagated mainly by Karma Kagyu and Nyingma lamas. In particular, the eighth Tai Situpa (1700–1774) and Katok Tsewang Norbu (1698–1755)—Karma Kagyu and Nyingma lamas, respectively, and close colleagues—were very instrumental in reviving shentong among their sects.

Also instrumental was Situ Panchen (1700–1774), senior court chaplain in the Kingdom of Derge, a student of Katok Tsewang Norbu. "In the end it would be Situ more than anyone who would create the environment for the widespread acceptance of the Shentong theories in the next century. This revival was continued by Jamgon Kongtrul, a nineteenth-century ecumenical (rimé) scholar and forceful exponent of shentong. shentong views were also advanced recently by the eminent Kagyu Lamas Kalu Rinpoche and Khenpo Tsultrim Gyamtso Rinpoche.

Criticisms and repression
Shentong views have often come under criticism by followers of all four of the main Tibetan Buddhist schools, but particularly by the Gelug. Shentong was suppressed by the dominant Gelug school for several hundred years, equally for political reasons as doctrinal reasons. In 1658, the Gelug authorities banned the Jonang school for political reasons, forcibly converting its monks and monasteries to the Gelug school, as well as banning shentong philosophy and books, thus making the rangtong position the overwhelmingly majority one in Tibetan Buddhism.

"Exclusive Rangtongpas", as the contemporary western Kagyu scholar S. K. Hookham would call them, have claimed that shentong views are inconsistent with the basic Mahāyāna teaching of emptiness, because Shentongpas posit an absolute. They sometimes label shentong Madhyamaka "eternalistic Madhyamaka."

The great fourteenth-century Sakya master Buton Rinchen Drub (1290–1364) was very critical of shentong views. Gyaltsab Je and Khedrup Gelek Pelzang, 1st Panchen Lama, two of Gelug founder Je Tsongkhapa's primary disciples, were also particularly critical of the shentong views of their time.

Among Kagyupas and Nyingmapas, the noted nineteenth-century Nyingma lama Jamgon Ju Mipham Gyatso wrote works both supportive and critical of shentong positions,{{refn|group=note|I.e., in his Lion's Roar of Extrinsic Emptiness (q.v. external link cited below) and in his Long Excursus on the Core of Thus-Arrivedness i.e., tathãgatagarbha (bde-gshegs snying-po stong-thun chen-mo seng-ge'i nga-ro). In the Long Excursus Mipham Rinpoche follows closely the gist of an historically much earlier discussion of the subject of "lineage",  that of Longchenpa's Treasure of Philosophical Systems (grub mtha' mdzod). There Mipham identifies two general extremes of interpretation, the nihilistic identification of Buddha-nature with emptiness to the exclusion of form, and the identification of Buddha-nature as a substantially real entity that is "empty-of-other" (gzhan-gyis stong-pa). Thus it appears that Mipham Rinpoche wished to distance himself from both the Gelug/Sakya mainstream (e.g., rangtong or self-emptiness) interpretation as well as the shentong mainstream. However, what Mipham refers to in the Long Excursus as shentong is only vaguely defined as such, and to that extent, bears more resemblance to the stock misinterpretations of shentong as given by its ideological opponents, than with any actual position held by classical Shentongpas themselves. In the final analysis, both Longchenpa's and Jamgon Ju Mipham Gyatso's interpretations of Buddha-nature in the aforementioned texts are substantially identical with most (though not all) of the most important philosophical distinctions invoked by Dolpopa and others in propounding the superiority and definitude of shentong approaches. Where Longchenpa and Mipham differ most obviously from self-identified Shentongpa commentators is in not applying the shentong label to their positions, such as Great Madhyamaka of Other-Emptiness" (gzhan-stong dbu-ma chen-po).}} as did  Mikyö Dorje, 8th Karmapa Lama.

Scholarly studies
According to Burchardi, limited attention is given in academic studies to the various interpretations of gzhan stong.

The contemporary western Kagyu scholar Karl Brunnhölzl argues that there is no such thing as "shentong Madhyamaka," but rather that orthodox Yogācāra philosophy (when understood properly) is entirely compatible with Madhyamaka, and therefore shentong is not a novel position. He argues that Yogācāra has often been mischaracterized and unfairly marginalized in Tibetan Buddhist curricula.

See also
 Nondualism

Notes

References
Citations

Works cited

 
 
 
 
 
 
 
 
 

 
 

Further reading
 
 
 

 
 
 
 
 
 
 

External links

 Nigel Wellings (2009), Is there anything there? – the Tibetan Rangtong Shentong debate Adele Tomlin (2018), The Shentong View of Emptiness – A Short Introduction and Reader'
Alexander Berzin, Self-Voidness and Other Voidness
An exposition of the two truths by Khenpo Tsultrim Gyamtso Rimpoche
Scholarly disquisition on The Buddha Within

 
 
Buddha-nature
Jonang
Tibetan Buddhist philosophical concepts